The 1975–76 Segunda División was the 27th season of the Mexican Segunda División. The season started on 2 August 1975 and concluded on 18 July 1976. It was won by San Luis.

In this season the champion definition system changed, the two best teams in each group advanced to a league of two groups with four teams each, the winner of each sector had to play a final series to determine the champion.

Changes 
 Tecos was promoted to Primera División.
 Ciudad Madero was relegated from Primera División, however, the team was dissolved at the end of the season.
 UAEM, Tapatío and Estudiantes de Querétaro were promoted from Tercera División.
 Iguala, Ciudad Sahagún and Deportivo Acapulco were relegated from Segunda División.
 Pachuca returned after a year in hiatus.
 Nacional was relocated at Ciudad Guzmán, Jalisco.

Teams

Group stage

Group 1

Group 2

Group 3

Group 4

Results

Promotion stage

Group 1

Group 2

Final

References 

1975–76 in Mexican football
Segunda División de México seasons